The 4th constituency of Seine-Saint-Denis is a French legislative constituency in the Seine-Saint-Denis département.

Deputies

Election results

2022

 
 
 
 
 
 
 
 
|-
| colspan="8" bgcolor="#E9E9E9"|
|-
 
 

 
 
 
 

* Taïbi ran as a dissident member of the PCF, without the endorsement of the NUPES alliance. Despite qualifying for the second round, he withdrew his candidacy on 14 June, leaving Bourouaha as the only candidate.

2017

 
 
 
 
 
 
|-
| colspan="8" bgcolor="#E9E9E9"|
|-

2012

 
 
 
 
|-
| colspan="8" bgcolor="#E9E9E9"|
|-
 
 

 
 
 
 

* Withdrew before the 2nd round

2007

 
 
 
 
 
 
 
|-
| colspan="8" bgcolor="#E9E9E9"|
|-

2002

 
 
 
 
 
 
|-
| colspan="8" bgcolor="#E9E9E9"|
|-

1997

 
 
 
 
 
 
|-
| colspan="8" bgcolor="#E9E9E9"|
|-

Sources
 French Interior Ministry results website: 

4

References